Francavilla Angitola is a comune (municipality) in the Province of Vibo Valentia in the Italian region Calabria, located about  southwest of Catanzaro and about  northeast of Vibo Valentia.

Francavilla Angitola borders the following municipalities: Curinga, Filadelfia, Maierato, Pizzo, Polia.

In the località of Ponte Angitola, in the comune, is the Roman settlement and river crossing named Ad Fluvium Angitulam or Annicia.

Demographic evolution

References

Cities and towns in Calabria